is a Japanese voice actor affiliated with Aoni Production.

Filmography

Television animation
1991
 Kinnikuman: Kinnikusei Oui Soudatsu-hen, Golemman, Iwao, Leopardon, Mixer Taitei, Motorman, Rikishiman, Mr. Refereeman
1992
 Sailor Moon, Worker (ep 27)
1993
 Yuusha Tokkyuu Might Gaine, Jarmanee
 Dragon League, Torosa
 Slam Dunk, Takasado Kazuma
1994
 Marmalade Boy, Mr. Rainy
1995
 Romeo and the Black Brothers, Policeman B (ep 11), Sonny
 Slayers, Examiner B (ep 16)
1996
 Gegege no Kitarō, Kani-Boushu (2nd), Yagyou-san (2nd)
1998
 DT Eightron, Uouru
 Doctor Slump (Remake), Gorilla
 Bomberman B-Daman Bakugaiden, Shinpanbon
1999
 Turn A Gundam, Corin Nander
 Colorful, Itani
 Digimon Adventure, Shellmon
 One Piece, Hocker, Tansui, Elizabeth
2000
 Ghost Stories, Janitor
 Inuyasha, Sesshomaru's Ogre, Tsubaki's Ogre, Undead Ogre
 Shinzo, Sago
2001
 Run=Dim, Shōhei Moriguchi
 Project ARMS, Aya's Father
 Sugar: A Little Snow Fairy, Farmer B (ep 16)
 Project ARMS: The 2nd Chapter, Keith Silver
2002
 Ultimate Muscle, Brocken Jr.
 MegaMan NT Warrior, Glide
 Jing: King of Bandits, Sweet Stout (ep 10)
 Witch Hunter Robin, Custodian (ep 1), Morie
 Mobile Suit Gundam Seed, Fredrik Ades, Herman Gould (ep 7)
 Tsuri Baka Nisshi, Chief Akiyama, Hazetarou (1st Voice), Narration
2003
 E's Otherwise, Balk
 The World of Narue, Avalonian
 Super Kuma-san, Ice Cream Vendor
 Sonic X, Mr. Smith (ep 37)
 Popotan, Doctor (ep 3)
 Planetes, Male Actor (ep 5)
 Rumbling Hearts, Haruka's Father
 Chrono Crusade, Farm Owner
2004
 Sgt. Frog, Gesu-chan (ep 13)
 Kinnikuman Nisei - Ultimate Muscle (2004), Barrierfreeman (Nils), Brocken Jr.
 Girls Bravo, Supermarket Manager (ep 8)
 Samurai Gun, Geki Ooi (ep 2)
2005
 Fushigiboshi no Futago Hime, Cerias
 Full Metal Panic! The Second Raid, Uekusa
 Black Cat, Maro
2006
 Gintama, Andoromeda Suitsu (ep 66), Puu (ep 1), Young Master (ep 38)
 Yume Tsukai, Kisaragi (ep 5)
 Chocotto Sister, Butcher (ep 3, 5, 13), Driver (ep 13, 17), Full-time employee (ep 4)
 D.Gray-man, Akuma C (ep 45)
 Buso Renkin, Crewmember Two
 Super Robot Wars OG: Divine Wars, Tenzan Nakajima
 Code Geass: Lelouch of the Rebellion, Commander (ep 2, 10)
 Pururun! Shizuku-chan, Aseo-kun
2007
 Gegege no Kitarō, Chef (ep 78), Chimi-Mouryou (ep 64), Fuushu (ep 41), Kouta's Father (ep 10), Michrophone Man (ep 69), Owner (ep 99)
 Pururun! Shizuku-chan Aha, Aseo-kun
2008
 H2O: Footprints in the Sand, Teruo Hozumi
 Porfy no Nagai Tabi, Mario
 Hakaba Kitarō, Co-Forest president (ep 6), Doctor (ep 1), Mizugami (ep 6, 7)
 Hakushaku to Yōsei, Marquess (ep 1)
2009
 Lupin III vs. Detective Conan, SP
 Cross Game, Seiji Tsukishima
 Dragon Ball Kai, Mr. Popo
 Eden of the East, Airport Staff (ep 2)
2011
 Rio: Rainbow Gate!, Charlie (ep 13)
2014
 Marvel Disk Wars: The Avengers, Absorbing Man
2016
 Pandora in the Crimson Shell: Ghost Urn, Myrmidon of Chicken Brothers E (ep 7)
2017
 Dragon Ball Super, Mr. Popo, Rumoosh, Zarbuto
 Mahōjin Guru Guru, Adamski (ep 10 - 16)

Original video animation (OVA)
 Bewitching Nozomi (1992), Boxing Club member (volume 1), Jack (volume 3)
 Kamen Rider SD (1993), Kamen Rider X
 Kishin Corps (1993), Al (ep 6-7), Guard (ep 1), Mochizuki (ep 3)
 Fatal Fury 2: The New Battle (1993), Ring Announcer
 Fortune Quest (1993), Nol
 Grappler Baki (1994), Kongo Ryu
 Weather Report Girl (1994)
 Fire Emblem (1996), Dorga
 Dokyusei 2 (1996), Akira Kawajiri
 Twilight of the Dark Master (1998), Squad Leader
 All Purpose Cultural Cat-Girl Nuku Nuku DASH! (1998), Computer (ep 5), Director A (ep 1–3, 5–7, 9, 11), Man in Black A (ep 7), Townsperson B (ep 11)
 Saint Seiya: The Hades Chapter - Inferno (2005), Golem Rock
 Kimi ga Nozomu Eien: Next Season (2007), Souichirou Suzumiya (ep 1)

Theatrical animation
 Dragon Quest: Dai no Daiboken Tachiagare! Aban no Shito (1992), Mariners C
 Dragon Ball Z: Broly – The Legendary Super Saiyan (1993), Moa
 Turn A Gundam: Earth Light (2002), Corin Nander
 Turn A Gundam: Moonlight Butterfly (2002), Corin Nander
 Crayon Shin-chan: Arashi wo Yobu! Yuuhi no Kasukabe Boys (2004), Justice's Subordinate
 Mobile Suit Gundam SEED: Special Edition (2004), Fredrik Ades
 Black Jack: The Two Doctors Of Darkness (2005), Doctor
 Sword of the Stranger (2007), Samurai

Tokusatsu
Denkou Choujin Gridman (1993), Khan Giorgio (ep 37)
Mirai Sentai Timeranger (2000), Bomb-Maker D.D. Ladis (ep 1, 32)
Hyakujuu Sentai Gaoranger (2001), Vase Org (ep 23)
Ninpu Sentai Hurricaneger (2002), Severing Ninja Shiransu (ep 6)
Bakuryu Sentai Abaranger (2003), Trinoid 9: Bankumushroom (ep 10)
Tokusou Sentai Dekaranger (2004), Botsian Zortac (ep 32-33)
Ultraman Max (2005), Alien Sran (ep 4)
Ultraman Mebius (2006), Alien Fanton (ep 7, 49-50)
Shuriken Sentai Ninninger (2015), Yokai Nurikabe (ep 22)

Video games
Langrisser (1991), Zeldo
Langrisser II (1994), Zeldo
Inuyasha (2001), Sesshomaru's Ogre
Dynasty Warriors 3 (2001), Huang Zhong and Zhang Jiao
Dynasty Warriors 4 (2003), Huang Zhong and Zhang Jiao
Mega Man X: Command Mission (2004), Steel Massimo
Metal Gear Solid 3: Snake Eater (2004), Commander
Super Robot Wars: Original Generations (2007), Tenzan Nakajima and Gaza Haganar
Rune Factory Frontier (2008), Tsubute
Klonoa (2008), King Seadoph, Balue
Warriors Orochi 3 (2011), Huang Zhong, Zhang Jiao
The Wonderful 101 (2013), Laambo, Walltha
Fitness Boxing: Fist of the North Star (2022), Jagi

Dubbing

Live-action
Armageddon, Samoan
Company of Heroes, Lt. Dean Ransom (Tom Sizemore)
Dynasty Warriors, Zhang Jiao (Philip Keung)
I Feel Pretty, Mason (Adrian Martinez)
What Dreams May Come, Albert Lewis (Cuba Gooding Jr.)

Animation
The Batman (Penguin/Oswald Cobblepot)
Thomas the Tank Engine & Friends (Toby (Season 1-8), Spencer (Season 7-8), Terence (Season 1-5), Max (Season 6), Stephen Hatt (Season 8), Farmer McColl (Season 8) and Lord Callan (Season 7))
Thomas and the Magic Railroad (Toby)
Shirt Tales (Prariedog Pete from "Moving Time")

References

External links
 

1966 births
Japanese male video game actors
Japanese male voice actors
Male voice actors from Tokyo
Living people
Place of birth missing (living people)
20th-century Japanese male actors
21st-century Japanese male actors
Aoni Production voice actors